Feral: Searching for Enchantment on the Frontiers of Rewilding (also published as Feral: rewilding the land, sea and human life) is a 2013 book by the British activist George Monbiot. In it, Monbiot discusses rewilding, particularly in the United Kingdom. It was first published by Allen Lane, a hardback imprint of the Penguin Group. The book received positive critical reviews, and won several awards. It inspired the founding of Rewilding Britain.

Background
By Monbiot's own account, rewilding was a fringe interest at the time he published the book. However, there had been attempts at rewilding in Britain such as "Wild Ennerdale" at Ennerdale, Cumbria, a project which Monbiot finds limited in scope.

The word ‘rewilding’ entered the dictionary in 2011, with its definition greatly contested from the start. Initially, it was defined as releasing captive animals into the wild, but the definition was soon expanded to describe the reintroduction of animal and plant species to habitats from which they had been excised. In other circles, the term is used to indicate the rehabilitation of entire ecosystems, instead of particular species only. The definitions preferred by the author differ slightly from these, as they entail permitting ecological processes to resume (without human intervention), and embracing the fluctuations in the physical environment (instead of attempting to keep it in a state of arrested development). In summary, Monbiot defines the concept as follows: “Rewilding, to me, is about resisting the urge to control nature and allowing it to find its own way.”

Synopsis
Monbiot addresses readers who feel the urge for a wilder life and encourages them to challenge their perception of humankind’s place in the world, the world's ecosystems, and the interaction between humankind and nature. Monbiot looks at rewilding projects around the world, and pays particular attention to the scope for rewilding in the United Kingdom. He argues that overgrazing is a problem in the British uplands and calls for sheep numbers to be reduced so that areas can be rewilded. 

Among other topics, the author looks at the phenomenon of British big cats, supposed sightings which in his view reflect human origins in a wilder landscape.

After initial chapters that serve as an introduction to the author’s personal and academic interest in the subject matter, the content takes the form of case studies. According to the author, case studies relating successful rewilding projects around the world (Scotland, Wales, North America) serve to provide examples of good practice and offer the reader hope (that rewilding is indeed possible). In chapter 11, “The Beast Within (or how not to rewild)”, case studies of rewilding in Slovenia, Croatia, Eastern Poland and the Americas that occurred as result of political tyranny, civil war, genocide and tyranny serve as cautionary tales. The author strongly believes that rewilding must not be an opposition to the people who live on and benefit from the land but must be done with their consent and active engagement.

Reception 
Monbiot's book received criticism from organisations representing farmers, such as the Farmers' Union of Wales. On the other hand, the book received favourable reviews, including in publications normally hostile to Monbiot's work, such as The Spectator and The Daily Telegraph. Many reviewers were impressed by the lyrical nature of the book's prose style. According to the New Statesmans reviewer "something about the charm and persistence of Monbiot’s argument has the hypnotic effect of a stoat beguiling a hapless rabbit".

Awards
The book won awards from: 
 The Zoological Society of London: Thomson Reuters/Zoological Record Award (2013). Presented for the public communication of zoology.
 The Society of Biology: Book Award for general biology (2014). Dr William Marshall, Fellow of the Society of Biology and chair of the judging panel, said Feral was an “important and captivating book concerning humanity’s stewardship of the earth”.
 Orion magazine: The Orion Book Award for nonfiction (2015).

Outcomes
One of the outcomes of the book was the charity Rewilding Britain founded in 2015.

The debate between Monbiot and the farming community about the management of Britain's uplands continued, for example in the aftermath of the Storm Desmond floods in Cumbria in December 2015.
The authorities responded to the floods with engineering projects such as constructing raised linear walls and embankments along the River Kent in Kendal, but there has also been a commitment to making use of natural flood control. A small deculverting scheme has been trialled in Kendal and upstream measures are planned "to slow the flow of water and provide wider environmental benefits across the catchment". In 2022 a programme to restore and improve rivers in the Lake District won the European Riverprize.

See also 

 Rewilding (conservation biology)
 Lynx reintroduction in Great Britain

External links 

 Author's Ted Talk on rewilding

References

2013 non-fiction books
Books by George Monbiot
Rewilding
British non-fiction books
Allen Lane (imprint) books
Environmental non-fiction books
Ecology books
Penguin Books books